A list of Wardens of Keble College, Oxford. The head of Keble College, University of Oxford is called the Warden. The current Warden is Sir Michael Jacobs, since October 2022.

List of Wardens
 Edward Stuart Talbot 1870–1888
 Robert Wilson 1888–1897
 Walter Lock 1897–1920
 Beresford Kidd 1920–1939
 Harry James Carpenter 1939–1955
 Eric Symes Abbott 1956–1960
 Austin Farrer 1960–1968
 Spencer Barrett (Acting Warden, 1968–1969)
 Dennis Nineham 1969–1979
 Christopher Ball 1980–1988
 George Barclay Richardson 1988–1994
 Dame Averil Cameron 1994–2010
 Sir Jonathan Phillips, 2010–.
 Sir Michael Jacobs, 2022–.

References

 
Keble
Keble